The fifth season of Melrose Place, an American television series, premiered on Fox on September 9, 1996. The season five finale aired on May 19, 1997, after 34 episodes. 

The season was produced by Chip Hayes, supervising producer Dee Johnson, co-executive producers Carol Mendelsohn and Charles Pratt, Jr., and executive producers Aaron Spelling, E. Duke Vincent and Frank South.

The season was released on DVD as two-volume box sets under the title of Melrose Place - The Fifth Season: Volumes One and Two. The first volume being released on February 10, 2009 and the latter volume being released on November 24, 2009 by Paramount Home Video.

Storylines

A detective tells Amanda (now married to Peter, who's incarcerated for Bobby's murder) that Peter is not who he claims to be. Jane and Sydney are concerned that the truth will emerge about what happened to Richard, who harasses and threatens the sisters (who do not know that he is alive). Jake and Alison begin an affair behind Billy's back. Kimberly couldn't remember her dinner with Peter, and his trial was only a few days away. Two characters are introduced: Taylor McBride (Lisa Rinna) and her husband Kyle (Rob Estes), a Boston restaurateur. Learning of Peter's arrest, Taylor goes to Los Angeles for answers, rents Jo's vacant apartment and persuades Kyle to move their restaurant to L.A. She seems to have a secret involving Peter, and clashes with Amanda.

Richard stalks Jane and Sydney. Artist Samantha Reilly (Brooke Langton)—Jane's new roommate—suspects that something is wrong. He is killed by a police officer when he tries to shoot the sisters at a rural convenience store, and the police let them keep the money he stole from Jane.

Kimberly begins to remember the dinner, and the waiter who waited on her and Peter is found. Peter is released as Taylor grows closer to him. Drinking heavily, he spends time at Kyle's restaurant. Alison declines Billy's proposal; she and Jake grow closer, and Billy's jealousy increases. When Jane learns about Jake and Alison's relationship she throws a brick through their bedroom window, slashes Alison's tires and obtains a restraining order against Jake. Taylor tells Peter that she is Taylor Davis, younger sister of his late wife Beth. Amanda begins to lose Peter as his interest in Taylor increases.

Another new character, Megan Lewis (Kelly Rutherford), meets Michael when he runs on the beach. They begin an affair, since Kimberly has been ordered by her psychiatrist not to have sex. When he learns that Megan is a prostitute, Michael wants to be the only man in her life.

Amanda meets a co-worker, Craig Field (David Charvet), whose father (Michael Des Barres) is her boss. Craig learns that he inherited the company from his mother, and harasses Amanda. His father dies of a heart attack after Amanda learns that he was involved in Craig's grandfather's murder.

Michael finds Megan and Kimberly talking, and learns that Kimberly hired Megan to sleep with him. Michael makes Megan give up prostitution (assuring her that he will pay her living expenses), and Kimberly learns that she has a brain tumor and three months to live.

Jane discovers that she was adopted and meets her mother, Sherry (Donna Mills). After she is robbed, Jane leaves her apartment and business to Sydney and visits her family in Chicago.

Alison learns that she is pregnant with Jake's baby. Ambivalent about the pregnancy, she returns to D & D and has a miscarriage which leaves her infertile. Despite this, they marry.

Matt's drug use becomes known and he enters rehab, beginning a relationship with director Dan Hathaway (Greg Evigan). Dan is domineering and physically abusive, and Matt leaves him after Peter threatens to have Dan fired if he does not address his behavioral problems.

Taylor and Kyle's marriage is troubled, and Kyle has a one-night stand with Sydney. Sydney is in a relationship with millionaire Carter Gallavan (Chad Lowe), which ends when he learns about her attraction to Kyle. A con artist fakes an accident at Sydney's store and, left penniless after a trial, she becomes a con artist herself.

Michael and Kimberly divorce as she coaxes him towards Megan. After Kimberly tells Megan she is planning suicide, she and Michael are injured in a car accident. Although Michael has a dream where Megan pulls him into heaven as Kimberly pulls him into hell, he promises Kimberly he will spend his last days with her and they reconcile.

Billy and Samantha begin a relationship after her fling with Craig. After they move in together, her abusive father (who has escaped from prison) appears, demands money from them and takes off; the police tap their phone.

Jake reconciles with his son and ex-girlfriend after her husband leaves them, and Alison (who sees that he needs a family) pretends to start drinking again so he can leave her. Alison leaves for Atlanta, and Jake sells Shooters and moves to Ojai to join his former girlfriend and their son.

Peter and Taylor begin an affair, and Kyle and Amanda both file for divorce. Peter begins making Taylor look and act like his late wife, which she detests. Michael and Megan marry; this is his fourth marriage.

He and Taylor drug Peter, convincing him that he has epilepsy. Michael cheats Peter out of the chief-of-staff position by tricking him into signing a contract. When Peter learns the truth he throws Michael through a window, cutting the surgeon's hands, and tries to push Taylor off a lighthouse in the season finale when she tells him she is pregnant.

Sydney plots against Amanda, falling down a spiral staircase during a party at D & D and faking injury. Although Craig pretends to be concerned about Sydney to save D & D from a lawsuit, a genuine relationship develops.

Kimberly's brain tumor in remission, she tries to break up Michael and Megan before dying in her mother's arms from a ruptured aneurysm. Amanda loses control of D & D after Craig and Sydney launch a new advertising agency, and Sydney accepts Craig's proposal.

Michael's troublemaking younger sister, Jennifer (Alyssa Milano), appears. The woman with whom Kyle had an affair in Boston, she tries to break up his marriage to Taylor and (later) his romance with Amanda.

Matt's teenaged niece, Chelsea (Katie Wright), moves in with him after her father's death. Her estranged mother, Denise (Nancy Lee Grahn), initially wins a custody battle with him for his niece, who decides to stay with Matt anyway.

In the season finale, Sydney and Craig marry; Kyle leaves in the middle of the wedding to find Amanda, who plans to move to New York, and they reconcile. Working as a grocery-store cashier, Samantha is taken hostage by her father and in a high-speed police chase. As Craig and Sydney stand outside the church Samantha and her father (with the police in pursuit) plow into the wedding party, crash through a bus stop next to the church and run Sydney down. The episode ends with Craig sobbing over Sydney's body.

Cast

Main cast members
In alphabetical order
 Josie Bissett as Jane Mancini (episodes 1–15)
 Thomas Calabro as Michael Mancini 
 David Charvet as Craig Field (episodes 28–34; recurring episodes 5–27) 
 Marcia Cross as Kimberly Shaw (episodes 1–27)
 Rob Estes as Kyle McBride
 Brooke Langton as Samantha Reilly
 Laura Leighton as Sydney Andrews 
 Lisa Rinna as Taylor McBride
 Kelly Rutherford as Megan Lewis (episodes 16–34; recurring episodes 5–15)  
 Doug Savant as Matt Fielding 
 Grant Show as Jake Hanson 
 Andrew Shue as Billy Campbell 
 Courtney Thorne-Smith as Alison Parker 
 Jack Wagner as Peter Burns

Special guest star
 Heather Locklear as Amanda Woodward

Recurring guest stars

Patrick Muldoon as Richard Hart
Greg Evigan as Dr. Dan Hathaway
Katie Wright as Chelsea Fielding 
Chad Lowe as Carter Gallavan 
Alyssa Milano as Jennifer Mancini 
Nancy Lee Grahn as Denise Fielding
Phil Morris as Walter
Scott Plank as Nick Reardon
Stacy Haiduk as Colleen Patterson
Donna Mills as Sherry Doucette

Episodes
<onlyinclude>

Controversies
In 1996, actress Hunter Tylo was cast in Melrose Place and opted to leave daytime soap opera The Bold and the Beautiful to take the role. However, she was fired by Melrose Place producer Aaron Spelling prior to filming any episodes for the series, when she announced she was pregnant. The character she was to play, Taylor McBride, was recast, Lisa Rinna taking the role. Tylo quickly returned to The Bold and the Beautiful. Tylo sued Spelling on grounds of discrimination for being pregnant and won $4.8 million from a Los Angeles jury. Spelling argued that Tylo's pregnancy rendered her unable to play the character, who was supposed to be a sexy seductress. During the trial, Tylo published pictures of herself while pregnant which showed that she retained a slim figure. Prior to trial, during the discovery phase of the litigation, Tylo's lawyers won a partial victory in an interlocutory appeal challenging a lower court's order compelling her to answer a broad range of personal questions. The Court of Appeal established Tylo's right to refuse to answer questions in her deposition about marital problems and psychological treatment, although the Court sustained the portion of the order which compelled her to answer questions about her efforts to become pregnant, her husband's ability or inability to impregnate her, and communications with her agent with respect to her efforts and ability to become pregnant. The case is widely recognized as an important one in establishing the right of privacy in deposition and the right of female actors to continue to work while pregnant.

References

1996 American television seasons
1997 American television seasons